The Duke of Rivoli was a title of French nobility which was granted to Marshal André Masséna in 1808.  The title was created as a 'victory title' by Emperor Napoléon I after the Battle of Rivoli.  As of 2021, the title along with the senior title of Prince of Essling is the only title created by Napoleon still in existence (which is not merged).

List of titleholders 

 1810–1817; André Masséna, 1st Duke of Rivoli (16 May 1758 – 4 April 1817)
 1818–1821; Jacques Prosper Masséna, 2nd Duke of Rivoli (25 June 1793 – 1821)
 1821–1863; François Victor Masséna, 3rd Duke of Rivoli (2 April 1799 – 16 April 1863)
 1863–1898; André Prosper Victor Masséna, 4th Duke of Rivoli (1829–1898)
 1898–1910; Victor Masséna, 5th Duke of Rivoli (14 January 1836 – 28 October 1910)
 1910–1974; André Prosper Victor Eugène Napoléon Masséna, 6th Duke of Rivoli (1891–1974)
 1974–present; Victor-André Masséna, 7th Duke of Rivoli (29 April 1950 – living)

Footnotes 

Dukes of Rivoli
Lists of French nobility
Lists of dukes
Noble titles created in 1808